George Bruce (5 August 1879 – 5 June 1928) was an Australian rules footballer who played with Carlton in the Victorian Football League (VFL) during the 1900s.

Family
The son of George Bruce and Annie Bruce, he was born on 5 August 1879. Bruce's older brothers, Jim and Percy, also played for West Adelaide. Married to Grace Bennett Bruce (1881-1945), née Murie, he had three children, Grace, George and Donald. He died on 5 June 1928.

Football
Bruce was a wingman and was cleared to Carlton from South Australian Football League club West Adelaide in 1903.

He was a member of three successive premiership sides from 1906 to 1908, the last of which came in a year when he represented Victoria in 1905 and at the 1908 Jubilee Carnival.
George Bruce, of Carlton, was the first player to introduce the tricky dodge of bending down, touching the ball on the ground, and then shooting past the man playing against him.Many have imitated him, but none has equalled him in this move. (The Herald, 1 August 1913)

See also
 1908 Melbourne Carnival

References

Sources
 Atkinson, G. (1982) Everything you ever wanted to know about Australian rules football but couldn't be bothered asking, The Five Mile Press: Melbourne. .
 
 Boyles Football Photos: George Bruce.

External links

 Blueseum profile

1879 births
Carlton Football Club players
Carlton Football Club Premiership players
West Adelaide Football Club players
Australian rules footballers from Adelaide
1928 deaths
Three-time VFL/AFL Premiership players